Kakizaki (written: 柿崎 or 蠣崎) is a Japanese surname. Notable people with the surname include:

, Japanese samurai
, Japanese women's basketball player
, Japanese artist, sculptor, and installation artist
, Japanese samurai

Japanese-language surnames